Denys Dmytrovych Shvydenko (born 22 April 2002) is a Ukrainian professional footballer who plays as a right-back for Dnipro-1.

References

External links
 
 

2002 births
Living people
Ukrainian footballers
Association football defenders
SC Dnipro-1 players
FC Nikopol players
Ukrainian Second League players
Sportspeople from Cherkasy Oblast